Hertfordshire County Council elections was held on 1 May 1997, with all 77 seats contested. The Council remained under No Overall Control with the Conservative Party forming the largest political group.

Results

By ward

Division Results

Broxbourne (6 Seats)

Dacorum (10 Seats)

East Herts (9 Seats)

Hertsmere (7 Seats)

North Herts (9 Seats)

St Albans (10 Seats)

Stevenage (6 Seats)

Three Rivers (6 Seats)

Watford (6 Seats)

Welwyn Hatfield (8 Seats)

References

1997 English local elections
1997
1990s in Hertfordshire